Agnès Sulem (born 1959) is a French applied mathematician whose research topics include stochastic control, jump diffusion, and mathematical finance.

Education 
Sulem earned a Ph.D. in 1983 at Paris Dauphine University, with the dissertation  Résolution explicite d'Inéquations Quasi-Variationnelles associées à des problèmes de gestion de stock supervised by Alain Bensoussan.

Career 
She is a director of research at the French Institute for Research in Computer Science and Automation (INRIA) in Paris, where she heads the MATHRISK project on mathematical risk handling. She is currently a professor at the University of Luxembourg in the Mathematics department. She is a coauthor of the book Applied Stochastic Control of Jump Diffusions (with Bernt Øksendal, Springer, 2005; 2nd ed., 2007; 3rd ed., 2019). Sulem is also an associate editor at the Journal of Mathematical Analysis and Applications and at the SIAM Journal on Financial Mathematics.

References

External links 
Agnès Sulem publications indexed by INRIA

1959 births
Living people
French mathematicians
French women mathematicians
Control theorists
Mathematical economists